Kyllinga is genus of flowering plants in the sedge family known commonly as spikesedges. They are native to tropical and warm temperate areas of the world, especially tropical Africa. These sedges vary in morphology, growing to heights from 2.5 centimeters to a meter and sometimes lacking rhizomes. They are closely related to Cyperus species and sometimes treated as part of a more broadly circumscribed Cyperus.

The genus was named for the 17th century Danish botanist Peder Lauridsen Kylling.

Species include:
Kyllinga brevifolia
Kyllinga coriacea
Kyllinga erecta
Kyllinga exigua
Kyllinga gracillima
Kyllinga melanosperma
Kyllinga nemoralis
Kyllinga odorata
Kyllinga planiculmis
Kyllinga polyphylla
Kyllinga pumila
Kyllinga squamulata
Kyllinga tibialis
Kyllinga triceps
Kyllinga vaginata

References

External links
Jepson Manual Treatment
Flora of Madagascar

 
Cyperaceae genera